The Kanagawa at-large district is a constituency of the House of Councillors in the Diet of Japan (national legislature) represented by six Councillors. It comprises the entire prefecture of Kanagawa and elects three Councillors every three years by single non-transferable vote.

Between 1947 and 1995 Kanagawa was represented by four Councillors. The 1994 electoral reform reapportioned the number of seats, increasing the number of Councillors in Miyagi, Saitama, Kanagawa and Gifu by two each (one per election) and reducing the number in Hokkaido, Hyogo and Fukuoka. Kanagawa, like most two-member districts, had often split seats between the two major parties, the Liberal Democratic Party (LDP) and the Japan Socialist Party (JSP). Following another reapportionment in the 2007 election when Tokyo gained an additional Councillor Kanagawa has the lowest electoral weight for the House of Councillors countrywide. As of September 2009, 7,301,452 voters were registered in Kanagawa.

Councillors from Kanagawa

Election results

References 
 House of Councillors: Historical members until January 2014 

Districts of the House of Councillors (Japan)